Cryphia fraudatricula is a species of moth belonging to the family Noctuidae.

Decription
Warren (1914) states 
M. fraudatricula Hbn.Forewing browner grey than Cryphia raptricula the lines black, conversely white-edged: the inner curved more vertically, connected with the outer by a thick black streak on sub-median fold . followed by another beyond outer line ; stigmata slightly darker than the ground ; hindwing dark grey. Widely spread throughout Europe. — The ab. simulatricula Guen., [. [now species Cryphia simulatricula (Guenée, 1852 ] queried from Florence by 
the author but referred by Staudinger to Castile and Aragon, is greyer, with the hindwing paler: the description is considerably like that of andalusiae Dup[onchel] (now Bryophila ravula] 

It is native to Southern Europe.

References

Noctuidae
Moths described in 1803